Robert Henry Williams (2 June 1870 – 17 March 1938) was an Australian politician.

He was born in Fitzroy to American-born grain merchant Robert Williams and Fanny Kendall. He attended state school and worked for his father before following the gold rush to Western Australia in the 1890s. Having been unsuccessful, he returned to Victoria and became a caterer and hotelier. He served on South Melbourne City Council from 1921 to 1932 and was mayor from 1927 to 1928. In 1922 he was elected to the Victorian Legislative Council as a Labor member for Melbourne West Province. He was a minister without portfolio from 1927 to 1928 and from 1929 to 1931, and Minister of Forests and Public Health from 1931 to 1932. He was Minister of Public Works, Mines and Immigration and Minister of Labour in 1932, but later that year was expelled from the Labor Party after supporting the Premiers' Plan. He remained in the Council as an independent until he was killed in a car crash at Wagga Wagga in 1938.

References

1870 births
1938 deaths
Australian Labor Party members of the Parliament of Victoria
Independent members of the Parliament of Victoria
Members of the Victorian Legislative Council